Jadaun, or Jadon, or  Jadav is the clan of the Rajput of Chandravanshi lineage, who claims to be Yaduvanshi Rajput.

History
Once upon a time, the state of Karauli were ruled by Jadaun Rajputs.  Their exit is from Brahmapal, the Yadavas, Yadu and claim descend from Krishna. The Kuldevi of the royal family of Karauli is Kaila Devi/ Yogmaya.

During the last decade of the twelfth century A.D., Jadauns sect of Rajputs ruled the territory in present-day Rajasthan with their capital at Bayana. In 1195-96 CE or thereabouts, Jadauns faced a invasion from the Ghurid conqueror Muizzudin Muhammad Ghuri who swept parts of Upper doab in his previous invasions. Mu'izz al-Din besieged the fortress at Thankar where Kumarpal stationed himself. He was defeated by the Ghurids, although according to Hasan Nizami his life was spared. Afterwards, Mu'izz al-Din captured Bayana and put it under the sway of Bahauddin Turghil.

References

Lunar dynasty

Rajput clans of Rajasthan
Rajput clans of Uttar Pradesh